"The Devil in Stitches" is a song written by Brett Gurewitz and performed by Bad Religion. It was the first single from their fifteenth studio album, The Dissent of Man, which was released on September 28, 2010.

Chart performance
The song impacted radio on August 24, 2010, reaching #39 on the Hot Modern Rock Tracks, while it reached #38 on the Rock Songs chart. It was also the 24th most played song on KROQ in 2010.

Appearances
The song was among those that appeared on formerly popular apps Tap Tap Revenge 3 and Tap Tap Revenge 4. Though the apps have now been taken off the App Store due to Disney no longer supporting it, the game and song remain for those who downloaded it previously.

References

Bad Religion songs
2010 singles
Songs written by Brett Gurewitz
Melodic hardcore songs
2010 songs
Epitaph Records singles